The 1946 Kansas Jayhawks football team was an American football team that represented the University of Kansas in the Big Six Conference during the 1946 college football season. In their first season under head coach George Sauer, the Jayhawks compiled a 7–2–1 record (4–1 against conference opponents), tied with Oklahoma for the conference championship, and outscored opponents by a combined total of 157 to 145. 

Seven Kansas players received honors from the Associated Press (AP) or United Press (UP) on the 1946 All-Big Six Conference football team: halfback Ray Evans (AP-1, UP-1); end Otto Schnellbacher (AP-1, UP-1); guard Don Fambrough (AP-1, UP-1); end David Schmidt (AP-2, UP-2); back Frank Pattee (UP-3); back Bud French (UP-3); and tackle Don Ettinger (UP-3).

The team played its home games at Memorial Stadium in Lawrence, Kansas.

Schedule

After the season

The 1947 NFL Draft was held on December 16, 1946. The following Jayhawks were selected.

References

Kansas
Kansas Jayhawks football seasons
Big Eight Conference football champion seasons
Kansas Jayhawks football